Thozalinone (USAN) (brand name Stimsen; former developmental code name CL-39808) is a psychostimulant that has been used as an antidepressant in Europe. It has also been trialed as an anorectic. Thozalinone is described as a "dopaminergic stimulant", and likely acts via inducing the release of dopamine and to a minimal extent norepinephrine; similar to analogue pemoline, it is seemingly devoid of abuse potential unlike common psychostimulants that increase catecholamines.

See also 
 Fenozolone

References 

Aminorexes
Antidepressants
Dimethylamino compounds
Lactams
Norepinephrine-dopamine releasing agents
Stimulants